Antonio Eduardo Furquim de Freitas Batista (born 25 September 1992), known as Tony, is a Brazilian football player who plays as a goalkeeper for Guarani.

Club career
He made his professional debut in the Campeonato Brasileiro Série B for Vila Nova on 16 July 2014 in a game against Boa.

References

External links
 

1992 births
Sportspeople from Goiás
Living people
Brazilian footballers
Brazilian expatriate footballers
Esporte Clube Rio Verde players
Vila Nova Futebol Clube players
Atlético Clube Goianiense players
América Futebol Clube (GO) players
Associação Atlética Anapolina players
C.F. União players
Leixões S.C. players
C.D. Cova da Piedade players
Campeonato Brasileiro Série B players
Campeonato Brasileiro Série C players
Liga Portugal 2 players
Brazilian expatriate sportspeople in Portugal
Expatriate footballers in Portugal
Association football goalkeepers